Isacova is a village in Orhei District, Moldova.

History 
Isacova is an old village in Orhei County, inhabited mostly by descendants of small land owners from medieval times ("razesi" (razashi) and "mazili"). 
According to one of the earliest documents mentioning Isacova, in 1645 is set the limit between Isacova and Orhei.

Notable people
 Teodor Uncu
 Gavril Buciușcan

References

 Documente privitoare la târgul și ținutul Orheiului, publicate cu un studiu introductiv de Sava Aurel, Institutul de Istorie Națională din București, București,1944, LV+561p, B.A.R.: II 234647+; B.C.U. Page 84.

Villages of Orhei District
Orgeyevsky Uyezd